Astrothelium condoricum is a species of corticolous (bark-dwelling), crustose lichen in the family Trypetheliaceae. Found in Ecuador, it was formally described as a new species in 2016 by André Aptroot. The lichen thallus is completely covered by a bright orange pigment; it also has a bright scarlet internal pigment. Chemical analysis of the lichen using thin-layer chromatography revealed the presence of two unnamed anthraquinones. The species epithet condoricum refers to the type locality.

References

condoricum
Lichen species
Lichens described in 2016
Lichens of Ecuador
Taxa named by André Aptroot